The International Committee on Taxonomy of Viruses (ICTV) authorizes and organizes the taxonomic classification of and the nomenclatures for viruses. The ICTV has developed a universal taxonomic scheme for viruses, and thus has the means to appropriately describe, name, and classify every virus that affects living organisms. The members of the International Committee on Taxonomy of Viruses are considered expert virologists. The ICTV was formed from and is governed by the Virology Division of the International Union of Microbiological Societies. Detailed work, such as delimiting the boundaries of species within a family, typically is performed by study groups of experts in the families.

History
The  International Committee on Nomenclature of Viruses (ICNV) was established in 1966, at the International Congress for Microbiology in Moscow, to standardize the naming of viruses. The ICVN published its first report in 1971. For viruses infecting vertebrates, the first report included 19 genera, 2 families, and a further 24 unclassified groups.

The ICNV was renamed the International Committee on Taxonomy of Viruses in 1974.

Organisational structure
The organisation is divided into an executive committee, which includes fixed-term elected roles, and six subcommittees, each of which is further divided into numerous 'study groups', which each consist of one chair and a variable number of members dedicated to the taxonomy of a specific taxon, such as an order or family. This structure may be visualised as follows:

Executive committee
 President
 Vice-president
 Secretaries
 Business Secretary
 Proposals Secretary
 Data Secretary
 Chairs – positions: 6 (one for each subcommittee)
 Elected members – positions: 8

Subcommittees
 Animal DNA Viruses and Retroviruses Subcommittee – study groups: 18
 Animal dsRNA and ssRNA- Viruses Subcommittee – study groups: 22
 Animal ssRNA+ Viruses Subcommittee – study groups: 15
 Bacterial and Archaeal Viruses Subcommittee – study groups: 19
 Fungal and Protist Viruses Subcommittee – study groups: 11
 Plant Viruses Subcommittee – study groups: 22

Objectives
The objectives of the International Committee on Taxonomy of Viruses are:

 To develop an internationally agreed taxonomy for viruses.
 To establish internationally agreed names for virus taxa.
 To communicate the decisions reached concerning the classification and nomenclature of viruses to virologists by holding meetings and publishing reports.
 To maintain an official index of agreed names of virus taxa.
 To study the virus effects in modern society and their behaviour.

Principles of nomenclature
The ICTV's essential principles of virus nomenclature are:
 Stability
 To avoid or reject the use of names which might cause error or confusion
 To avoid the unnecessary creation of names

The ICTV's universal virus classification system uses a slightly modified version of the standard biological classification system. It only recognises the taxa order, family, subfamily, genus, and species. When it is uncertain how to classify a species into a genus but its classification in a family is clear, it will be classified as an unassigned species of that family. Many taxa remain unranked. There are also, as of 2005, GenBank sequences assigned to 3,142 "species" which are not accounted for in the ICTV report (due to the way GenBank works, however, the actual number of proper species is probably significantly smaller).  The number of unidentified virus sequences is only expected to increase as the rate of virus sequencing increases dramatically.

The ICTV has been strikingly successful in achieving stability, since their inception in 1962.  Every genus and family recognized in the 1980s continued to be in use as of 2005, for example.

Naming and changing taxa
Proposals for new names, name changes, and the establishment and taxonomic placement of taxa are handled by the executive committee of the ICTV in the form of proposals. All relevant ICTV subcommittees and study groups are consulted prior to a decision being taken.

The name of a taxon has no official status until it has been approved by ICTV, and names will only be accepted if they are linked to approved hierarchical taxa. If no suitable name is proposed for a taxon, the taxon may be approved and the name be left undecided until the adoption of an acceptable international name, when one is proposed to and accepted by ICTV. Names must not convey a meaning for the taxon which would seem to either exclude viruses which are rightfully members of that taxon, exclude members which might one day belong to that taxon, or include viruses which are members of different taxa.

Rules for taxa

Species
A species name shall consist of as few words as practicable but must not consist only of a host name and the word virus. A species name must provide an appropriately unambiguous identification of the species. Numbers, letters, or combinations thereof may be used as species epithets where such numbers and letters are already widely used. However, newly designated serial numbers, letters or combinations thereof are not acceptable alone as species epithets. If a number or letter series is in existence it may be continued.

Genera
A virus genus is a group of related species that share some significant properties and often only differ in host range and virulence. A genus name must be a single word ending in the suffix -virus. Approval of a new genus must be accompanied by the approval of a type species.

Subfamilies
A subfamily is a group of genera sharing certain common characters. The taxon shall be used only when it is needed to solve a complex hierarchical problem. A subfamily name must be a single word ending in the suffix -virinae.

Families
A family is a group of genera, whether or not these are organized into subfamilies, sharing certain common characters with each other. A family name must be a single word ending in the suffix -viridae.

Orders
An order is a group of families sharing certain common characters. An order name must be a single word ending in the suffix -virales.

Rules for sub-viral agents
Rules concerned with the classification of viruses shall also apply to the classification of viroids. The formal endings for taxa of viroids are the word viroid for species, the suffix -viroid for genera, the suffix -viroinae for sub-families, should this taxon be needed, and -viroidae for families.

Retrotransposons are considered to be viruses in classification and nomenclature. Satellites and prions are not classified as viruses but are assigned an arbitrary classification as seems useful to workers in the particular fields.

Rules for orthography
 In formal taxonomic usage the accepted names of virus orders, families, subfamilies, and genera are printed in italics and the first letters of the names are capitalized.
 Species names are printed in italics and have the first letter of the first word capitalized. Other words are not capitalized unless they are proper nouns, or parts of proper nouns.
 In formal usage, the name of the taxon shall precede the term for the taxonomic unit.

Classification of viruses discovered by metagenomics 
Acknowledging the importance of viral metagenomics, the ICTV recognizes that genomes assembled from metagenomic data represent actual viruses and encourages their official classification following the same procedures as those used for viruses isolated and characterized using classical virology approaches.

ICTV reports
The ICTV has published reports of virus taxonomy about twice a decade since 1971 (listed below - "Reports"). The ninth ICTV report was published in December 2011; the content is now freely available through the ICTV website. Beginning in 2017 the tenth ICTV report will be published online on the ICTV website and will be free to access with individual chapters updated on a rolling basis. The 2018 taxonomy is available online., including a downloadable Excel spreadsheet of all recognized species.

ICTVdb database
ICTVdb is a species and isolate database that has been intended to serve as a companion to the ICTV taxonomy database. The development of ICTVdB has been supported by the ICTV since 1991 and was initially intended to aid taxonomic research. The database classifies viruses based primarily on their chemical characteristics, genomic type, nucleic acid replication, diseases, vectors, and geographical distribution, among other characteristics.

The database was developed at the Australian National University with support of the US National Science Foundation, and sponsored by the American Type Culture Collection. It uses the Description Language for Taxonomy  (DELTA) system, a world standard for taxonomic data exchange, developed at Australia's Commonwealth Scientific and Industrial Research Organisation (CSIRO). DELTA is able to store a wide diversity of data and translate it into a language suitable for traditional reports and web publication. For example, ICTVdB does not itself contain genomic sequence information but can convert DELTA data into NEXUS format. It can also handle large data inputs and is suited to compiling long lists of virus properties, text comments, and images.

ICTVdB has grown in concept and capability to become a major reference resource and research tool; in 1999 it was receiving over 30,000 combined online hits per day from its main site at the Australian National University, and two mirror sites based in the UK and United States.

In 2011, the ICTV decided to suspend the ICTVdb project and web site. This decision was made after it became apparent that the taxonomy provided on the site was many years out of date, and that some of the information on the site was inaccurate due to problems with how the database was being queried and processed to support the natural language output of the ICTVdb web site. The ICTV has begun discussions on how best to fix these problems, but decided that the time frame for updates and error correction were sufficiently long that it was best to take the site down rather than perpetuate the release of inaccurate information. As of August 2013, the database remains on hold. According to some views, "ICTV should also promote the use of a public database to replace the ICTV database as a store of the primary metadata of individual viruses, and should publish abstracts of the ICTV Reports in that database, so that they are 'Open Access'."

Reports 
 
 
 
 
 
 
 
 
  Also available online.
 ICTV 10th (online) Report

See also

 Glossary of scientific naming
 Virus classification
 Bioinformatics

References

External links

 
 
 Viral Bioinformatics Resource Center
 

Taxonomy (biology) organizations
Nomenclature codes
Systems of virus taxonomy
Organizations established in 1966
Virology organizations